The Valea Vinului is a left tributary of the river Someș in Romania. It discharges into the Someș in Valea Vinului.

References

Rivers of Romania
Rivers of Satu Mare County